Following are notable people who were either born, raised, or have lived for a significant period of time in Saugus, Massachusetts:

References

See also
List of people from Massachusetts

 
Saugus, Massachusetts
Saugus